Cesate is a comune (municipality) in the Metropolitan City of Milan in the Italian region Lombardy, located about  northwest of Milan.

Cesate borders the following municipalities: Limbiate, Solaro, Caronno Pertusella, Senago, Garbagnate Milanese .

The origin of the flag comes from the noble Cixate family.

History

During the Napoleonic era, the municipality was suppressed by a royal decree of 1809, and annexed to Garbagnate Milanese. Cesate regained its autonomy with the Austrian restoration

References

External links
 Official website

Cities and towns in Lombardy